Volodymyr Kilikevych  (born 30 November 1983, in Zhdanov, in the Ukrainian SSR) is a retired Ukrainian footballer and current football manager.

Honours
Iskra-Stal Rîbniţa
 Moldovan Cup: 2010–11
 Divizia Națională: Runners-up: 2009–10

Individual
 Top scorer of Moldovan Cup: 2010–11

External links
Profile at moldova.sports.md
Profile at Official FFU website (Ukr)

1983 births
Living people
Sportspeople from Mariupol
Ukrainian footballers
Ukrainian expatriate footballers
Expatriate footballers in Finland
Expatriate footballers in Moldova
Association football forwards
FC Mariupol players
FC Illichivets-2 Mariupol players
FC Oleksandriya players
FC Desna Chernihiv players
FK Dinamo Samarqand players
Expatriate footballers in Estonia
JK Narva Trans players
Meistriliiga players
TP-47 players
Ukrainian football managers
Ukraine under-21 international footballers
Ukrainian First League players
Ukrainian Second League players
FSC Mariupol managers
Ukrainian expatriate sportspeople in Estonia
Ukrainian expatriate sportspeople in Finland
Ukrainian expatriate sportspeople in Moldova
Ukrainian expatriate sportspeople in Uzbekistan
Expatriate footballers in Uzbekistan